RAF Jelgava was a Latvian football club based in Jelgava.The foundation of the club is considered in 1988 and for the first two years there were two teams of RAF Jelgava which in 1990 merged into one. One of those played in the lower Soviet leagues, the other – in the Latvian league.

Team history

Automobīlists Jelgava
The car factory club Automobīlists played in the lower Latvian leagues in the early 1970s, but in the mid 1970s were renamed Metālists.

Metālists Jelgava
The club first appeared in 1977 and in their debut season in the Latvian league finished 7th out of 13 teams. After three less than stellar seasons the club changed owners – it was attached again to the bus factory and renamed to Automobīlists Jelgava.

Automobīlists Jelgava
As Automobīlists the Jelgava squad also had it hard – at best it finished seasons in the middle of the table, and between 1983 and 1987 it played in the 1st league. In 1987 Automobīlists lost to Zemgale Ilūkste for a place in Virslīga but as the league was expanded under the name of RAF, Jelgava once again had a club in the top Latvian league.

RAF Jelgava
In 1988 and 1989 there were two teams of RAF Jelgava which in 1990 merged into one. One of those played in the lower Soviet leagues, the other – in the Latvian league. In 1988 and 1989 under the management of Viktors Ņesterenko the "local" RAF won the Latvian league, in 1988 as a golden double it also won the Latvian Cup. Meanwhile, the "international" RAF weren't doing that well – although they had in its squad several talented young players including Vladimirs Babičevs, Dzintars Sproģis, Igors Troickis and Aleksandrs Stradiņš, its results were very disappointing. In 1989 Ņesterenko took over the unified RAF team in the Soviet league and in the Baltic league. In 1990 and 1991 the team played better, but then the Soviet Union collapsed and RAF joined the Latvian Virslīga.

In the early 1990s RAF was one of the strongest teams in Virslīga, three times finishing second and once third (in 1992 they finished runners up to Skonto Rīga in an additional game after finishing the season on equal points). However, when the plant ran into financial difficulties, the team received new sponsorship from the University of Latvia in 1996 and, as a result, changed their name and relocated to Riga, and played in the Latvian University Stadium.

RAF Rīga
As RAF Rīga the club only played one season, finishing 5th in the Latvian league, however it won the 1996 Latvian Cup. But after the season the club changed its name again – this time to Universitāte Rīga.

Universitāte Rīga
The only season under the name of Universitāte didn't bring much success to the club – 6th place in the league with the club being disbanded after the season.

RAF Jelgava (again)
A team under the name RAF Jelgava appeared again in 2001 in the 1. līga. After the 2003 season the club merged with another Jelgava club – FK Viola Jelgava forming FK Jelgava.

League and Cup history

Soviet Union

RAF Jelgava

Baltic

RAF Jelgava

Latvian SSR
Metālists Jelgava

Automobīlists Jelgava

RAF Jelgava

Latvia

RAF Jelgava

RAF Rīga / FC Universitāte Rīga

FC Universitāte Rīga

RAF Jelgava

European record

Honours

Latvia
Latvian Higher League
Runners-Up (2): 1992, 1994, 1995
Latvian Cup
Winners (2):  1993, 1996

Latvian SSR
Latvian SSR Higher League
Winner: (2) 1988, 1989
Latvian Cup
Winners: (1) 1988

Notes
Note 1: As RAF Jelgava.
Note 2: As FC Universitate Riga.

References

Defunct football clubs in Latvia
1988 establishments in Latvia
2003 disestablishments in Latvia
Association football clubs established in 1988
Association football clubs disestablished in 2003